The eagle is a large bird of prey.

Eagle or The Eagle may also refer to:

Places

China 
 The Eagle (sinkhole), a sinkhole in Guangxi, China

England 
 Eagle, Lincolnshire, a village

United States 
 Eagle, Alaska, a city
 Eagle Village, Alaska, a census-designated place
 Eagle, Colorado, a statutory town
 Eagle, Idaho, a city
 Eagle, Illinois, an unincorporated community
 Eagle, Michigan, a village
 Eagle, Nebraska, a village
 Eagle, New Jersey, a ghost town
 Eagle, New York, a town
 Eagle, Pennsylvania, an unincorporated community
 Eagle, West Virginia, an unincorporated community
 Eagle, Wisconsin, a village
 Eagle (town), Wisconsin
 Eagle, Richland County, Wisconsin, a town
 Eagle Township (disambiguation)

Multiple countries 
 Eagle Creek (disambiguation)
 Eagle Island (disambiguation)
 Eagle Lake (disambiguation)
 Eagle Pass (disambiguation)
 Eagle River (disambiguation)

Outer space 
 Eagle Nebula
 Eagle (crater), landing spot on Mars of the rover Opportunity

Arts and entertainment

Films 
 The Eagle (1918 film), directed by Elmer Clifton
 The Eagle (1925 film), a silent film starring Rudolph Valentino
 The Eagle (1959 film), a Polish film
 Eagle (1990 film), a Croatian film
 The Eagle (2011 film), a British film starring Channing Tatum
 The Eagle (TV series), a Danish crime series

Music 
 Eagle Records, a record label
 The Eagle Band, an American jazz band in New Orleans (1895–1929)
 Eagle, a rock band formed by former members of the Beacon Street Union
 The Eagle (album), a 1990 album by Waylon Jennings
 "Eagle" (song), a 1977 song by ABBA
 "The Eagle" (song), a 1991 song recorded by Waylon Jennings
 "Eagle", a 2001 song recorded by Gotthard on the album Homerun

Other arts and entertainment 
 The Eagle (poem), written by Alfred, Lord Tennyson
 The Eagle (novel), the final book in Jack Whyte's Arthurian cycle
 Eagle (Middle-earth), the Great Eagles of J.R.R. Tolkien's Middle-earth
 Eagle (Calder), a 1971 abstract sculpture by Alexander Calder
 Eagle (British comics), a UK comic
 Eagle: The Making of an Asian-American President, a 1997 manga by Kaiji Kawaguchi
 The Eagle, hero of the six-issue American comic book series Red Menace
 Eagle Transporter, a fictional vehicle from the Space: 1999 television series

Businesses 
 Eagle Electric
 Eagle Food Centers, a former chain of grocery stores
 Eagle Games, a board game publisher
 Eagle Insurance, a vehicle insurance agency based in Chicago, IL
 Eagle Mobile
 Eagle Pencil Company, now known as Berol
 Eagle Snacks
 The Eagle, Cambridge, a pub
 The Eagle, a pub in Clerkenwell, London, the original gastropub
 The Eagle Tavern, a still-existing London pub cited in Pop Goes the Weasel
 The Eagle (bar), a name shared by multiple gay bars

Computer software and hardware 
 Eagle (application server), a CICS-to-Web development environment
 EAGLE (program), an electronic design automation software
 Eagle Computer, an early IBM-PC clone manufacturer
 Fujitsu Eagle, a model of disk drive popular in the 1980s
 The development codename of the Data General Eclipse MV/8000
 Eagle, a deep packet inspection system

In the military 
 Fisher P-75 Eagle, a World War II US Army Air Forces fighter
 McDonnell Douglas F-15 Eagle, a fighter aircraft
 AAM-N-10 Eagle, an American air-to-air missile
 Rolls-Royce Eagle, a V-12 aircraft engine of World War I
 Rolls-Royce Eagle XVI, an experimental aero engine developed in 1925
 Rolls-Royce Eagle (1944), an H-24 aircraft engine of the late 1940s
 , various British Royal Navy ships
 , various United States Navy ships
 Eagle-class patrol craft, a United States Navy class
 Mowag Eagle, a reconnaissance vehicle
 Roman eagle, the standard of a legion
 French Imperial Eagle

Publications
 The Eagle (newspaper), a list of daily newspapers
 The Eagle (magazine), the magazine of St. John's College, University of Cambridge
 Eagle (British comics), an illustrated comics paper for boys (1950-1994)

People 
 Eagle (name), a family name and given name, and lists of people with that name
 Laxsgiik, the Eagle Clan of the Tsimshian First Nation of British Columbia, Canada
 Ed Belfour (born 1965), Canadian retired ice hockey player nicknamed "The Eagle"
 Eddie "The Eagle" Edwards (born 1963), British ski jumper 
 Espen Bredesen (born 1968), Norwegian former ski jumper dubbed "Espen the Eagle"
 The Eagle, nickname of Anisur Rahman Zico (born 1997), Bangladeshi football goalkeeper
 The Eagle and American Eagle, and Jackie Fulton, ring names of American retired professional wrestler George Hines (born 1963)
 Starship Eagle, a ring name of Dan Spivey (born 1952), American retired professional wrestler
 The Eagle, nickname of Khabib Nurmagomedov (born 1988), Russian retired mixed martial artist

Radio stations 

 96.4 Eagle Radio, a radio station in Guildford, England
 CFXL-FM, a classic and contemporary rock station in High River, Alberta, Canada
 CKCH-FM, a country station in Cape Breton, Nova Scotia, Canada
 CKUV-FM, a classic rock station in Okotoks, Alberta, Canada
 KGLK, a classic rock station in Lake Jackson, Texas, US
 KKGL, a classic rock radio station in Boise, Idaho, US
 KNWN-FM, a classic rock radio station in Seattle, Washington, US
 WTOB (AM), a radio station in Winston-Salem, North Carolina, US
 WXGL, a classic rock station in Florida, US

Vehicles

Aircraft 
 Airtrike Eagle 5, a German ultralight
 American Aerolights Eagle, an ultralight
 Buckeye Eagle, an American powered parachute
 Wills Wing Eagle, an American hang glider

Cars 
 AMC Eagle, American Motors, from 1980 to 1987
 Eagle (automobile), Chrysler Corporation, from 1988 to 1998
 Eagle HF89, an IMSA Grand Touring Prototype built by All American Racers in 1989
 Eagle MkIII, an IMSA Grand Touring Prototype built by All American Racers in 1991
 North American Eagle Project, to attempt the land speed record
 Eagle Mk1, a 1960s Formula One car

Ships and boats 
 USCGC Eagle, various US Coast Guard ships
 , a ferry operated by Southern Ferries 1971 to 1975
 Eagle (yacht), a 12-metre class yacht
 Eagle (ship), a 20th century freighter sunk to create an artificial reef
 Eagle (steamboat), a 1900 passenger steamboat
 Eagle (HBC vessel), a brigantine operated by the HBC from 1827 to 1837 - see Hudson's Bay Company vessels
 Herreshoff Eagle, an American sailboat design

Other vehicles 
 Eagle Bus (1958–1993)
 Lunar Module Eagle, a spacecraft used in the Apollo 11 mission
 South Devon Railway Eagle class steam locomotive

Other uses 
 Eagle (golf), a score of two under par
 Eagle (heraldry), in a coat of arms
 Eagle (English coin), a nickname for a 13th-century coin
 Eagle (United States coin), a $10 gold coin
 European Association for Grey Literature Exploitation, a bibliographic database producer
 Racehorse that fell in the 1848 Grand National
 The American School in London mascot
 Eagle (typeface)
 Emerging and growth-leading economies, a group of emerging national economies
 Bald eagle, sometimes referred to as simply "eagle" in the United States

See also 
 
 Eagles (disambiguation)
 American Eagle Outfitters, a clothing brand
 Aquila (disambiguation) for the Latin word for Eagle
 Eagle Scout (disambiguation)

Lists of people by nickname